The 2004 American Handball Women's Youth Championships took place in São José dos Pinhais from September 21 – 25.

Teams

Preliminary round

Group A

Group B

Placement 5th–8th

7th/8th

5th/6th

Final round

Semifinals

Bronze medal match

Gold medal match

Final standing

References 
 brasilhandebol.com.br

2004 in handball
Pan American Women's Youth Handball Championship
2004 in youth sport